Acentrella barbarae is a species of small minnow mayfly in the family Baetidae. It is found in North America.

References

Mayflies
Insects described in 2006